Kalvanes (also Romanized as Kalvānes and Kalavāns; also known as Galavāns) is a village in Sokmanabad Rural District, Safayyeh District, Khoy County, West Azerbaijan Province, Iran. Its population is 3500, in about 350 families.

References 

Populated places in Khoy County